Norman Blundell (2 September 1917 – 9 December 2005) was an Australian cricketer. He played eight first-class cricket matches for Victoria between 1946 and 1951.

See also
 List of Victoria first-class cricketers

References

External links
 

1917 births
2005 deaths
Australian cricketers
Victoria cricketers
Cricketers from Melbourne
People from Carlton, Victoria